Cylichnoidea is a superfamily of sea snails or bubble snails, marine gastropod molluscs in the order Cylichnidae, the "chalice bubble snails".

Families 
 Colinatydidae Oskars, Bouchet & Malaquias, 2015
 Cylichnidae H. Adams & A. Adams, 1854
 Diaphanidae Odhner, 1914 (1857)
 Eoscaphandridae Chaban & Kijashko, 2016
 Mnestiidae Oskars, Bouchet & Malaquias, 2015
Taxon inquirendum
 Notodiaphanidae Thiele, 1931
Synonyms
 Amphisphyridae Gray, 1857: synonym of Diaphanidae Odhner, 1914 (1857)

References

External links 

Cephalaspidea
Gastropod superfamilies
Marine gastropods